Sextus Cocceius Anicius Faustus Paulinus (fl. 3rd century AD) was a Roman senator who was appointed suffect consul sometime before AD 260/268.

Biography
Probably either the son or nephew of Anicius Faustus Paulinus, suffect consul before AD 230, Faustus Paulinus was a member of the Patrician 3rd century gens Anicia. He was appointed suffect consul sometime before AD 260/268, and was the proconsular governor of Africa, most likely around AD 265/268, but it has been acknowledged that he may have filled the office sometime later, possibly between AD 276 and 285.

It has been speculated that he was possibly the father of Anicius Faustus Paulinus, the consul of AD 298.

Sources
 Martindale, J. R.; Jones, A. H. M, The Prosopography of the Later Roman Empire, Vol. I AD 260–395, Cambridge University Press (1971)
 Mennen, Inge, Power and Status in the Roman Empire, AD 193-284 (2011)

References

3rd-century Romans
Imperial Roman consuls
Roman governors of Africa
Year of birth unknown
Year of death unknown
Cocceius Faustus Paulinus, Sextus
Anicius Faustus Paulinus, Sextus
Roman patricians